Zulyn Dalkhjav (born 16 October 1942) is a Mongolian weightlifter. He competed in the men's bantamweight event at the 1972 Summer Olympics.

References

1942 births
Living people
Mongolian male weightlifters
Olympic weightlifters of Mongolia
Weightlifters at the 1972 Summer Olympics
Place of birth missing (living people)
20th-century Mongolian people